Mark Anthony Collins (born January 16, 1964) is a former American football cornerback and in the National Football League (NFL). He was drafted by the New York Giants in the second round of the 1986 NFL Draft. He played college football at Cal State Fullerton.

Collins also played for the Kansas City Chiefs, Green Bay Packers, and Seattle Seahawks. He was a two-time Super Bowl champion while with the Giants.

References

1964 births
Living people
American football cornerbacks
American football safeties
Cal State Fullerton Titans football players
Green Bay Packers players
Kansas City Chiefs players
New York Giants players
Seattle Seahawks players
Sportspeople from San Bernardino, California